Afrizal Malna (born 7 June 1957 in Jakarta, Indonesia), is an Indonesian activist, writer of prose, poetry, and theatrical texts.

Biography
Afrizal Malna before beginning his career into writing, studied at the Driyakara College of Philosophy. His poems are predominantly an expression of material aspects in urban existence. Taking images from daily life, Malna juxtaposes them to bring forth the noise and chaos of our existence today. He is fond of seeking connections among different objects in his poems, which he describes as "visual grammar of things". In 1995, Afrizal Malna participated in the International Poets Festival in Rotterdam, Netherlands. He is also a featured poet on the Poetry International Web. His poetry collection Teman-Temanku dari Atap Bahasa (My Friends from the Roof of Language), published in 2008 was chosen as the best literary work of 2009 by the Indonesian news magazine Tempo. He is associated with a number of magazines, such as Horizon, Kompas Daily, News Buana, Republic, Rule of the People, Java Post, Surabaya Post, and Mind of Representatives.

Besides composing poems, Afrizal Malna has also written short stories and has published two prose books, Novel yang Malas Mengisahkan Manusia (A Novel Reluctant to Tell of Humans) in 2003, and Lubang dari Separuh Langit (A Hole from Half the Sky) in 2004. In his book entitled Journey Theatre Anthology Second Body and the Word, Afrizal Malna talks about theater. In order to discuss theater across Indonesia, Afrizal Malna has traveled to Switzerland and Hamburg.

Awards
 Best Literary Work 2009 from the Indonesian news magazine Tempo for the poetry collection Teman-Temanku dari Atap Bahasa
 Essay Literary magazine Horison (1997)
The Silence In Microphone, Architecture Rain (1995) received an award from the Center for Development and the Ministry of Education and Language Development Cultural Affairs in 1996
 Republika Award for essay in Senimania Republika, Republika (1994)
 Literature Book Prize by Jakarta Arts Council, (1984)
 Bronze Reel to script monologue from Radio Netherlands Wereldomroep (1981)
 Kusala Sastra Khatulistiwa Awards for Best Poetry Anthology 2013
 Best Performing Art Critic 2014 from Ministry of Culture and Education of the Indonesian Republic
 DAAD Berliner Kuenstlerprogramm des DAAD stipendium (Artist in Residence of 2014–2015)

Publications

Translations
 Traum der Freiheit Indonesien 50 jahre nach der Unabhangigkeit (Hendra Pasuhuk & Edith Koesoemawiria, 1995)
 Frontiers of World Literature (Iwanami Shoten, Publishers, Tokyo, 1997)
 Poets, Friends Around the World (Mitoh-Sha, Tokyo, 1997)
 Menagerie 3 (John H. McGlynn, 1997)
 Do Lado Dos Ollos Arredor da poesia, entrevistas con 79 Poetas do Mundo (Emiilio Arauxo, Edicions do cumio, 2001)
 Anxiety Myth (Andy Fuller, Lontar Foundation, 2013)
 Druckmaschine Drittmensch (Ulrike Draesner, interlinearuebersetzungen von Sophie Mahakam Anggawi, Katrin Bandel, DAAD -Berliner Kuenstlerprogramm des DAAD, 2015)

Performing Arts
 Hormat dan Sampah (1995)
 Kesibukan Mengamati Batu-Batu (1996)
 Telur Matahari (2003)

References

External links
 Common Language Workshop
 Thesis: KRITIK MODERNITAS: PEMBACAAN SEMIOTIKA PUISI-PUISI AFRIZAL MALNA
 with English translations of Afrizal Malna's poetry Poetry Afrizal Malna
Poetry International's poem of the week, translated poem by Afrizal Malna, i just mopped the floor Poem of the Week

Minangkabau people
Indonesian writers
Living people
1957 births